Karyn Calabrese (born April 20, 1947) is an American raw foodist and restaurateur. Her first restaurant, Karyn's Raw Bistro, is the longest-standing gourmet raw food restaurant in the United States.

Early life 
Calabrese grew up in Hyde Park, a South Side neighborhood of Chicago. Calabrese worked as a professional model in her teens and into her twenties, and was featured in national magazine and television commercials.

Career 

Calabrese became a raw foodist with the impression that eating uncooked foods improves health. In the early 1980s, she hosted a support group at her home. Calabrese decided to transition careers from modeling to cooking and consulting about the raw and vegan lifestyle.

Calabrese has opened three restaurants (Karyn's Raw Bistro, Karyn's Cooked, and Karyn's On Green), a market (Karyn's Fresh Corner), a meal program (Karyn's At Home), a holistic therapy center (Karyn's Inner Beauty Center and O2 Day Spa), a branded line of food, a cookbook, a cleanse guide, and a natural make-up and skin care line. Karyn also teaches workshops and promotes raw foodism, holistic therapies, and natural longevity.

Calabrese began having financial problems in 2012 after her restaurant in Lincoln Park burned down and business at her other locations stifled; in 2015 and 2016 she had been sued four times, for failing to meet accessibility standards for disabled persons at her restaurants, not paying rent for the spaces of her restaurants, and not paying condominium fees where she lived. She started a GoFundMe campaign to help keep her business afloat, but faced accusations of fraud and unsanitary practices.

In 2017, her flagship restaurant in Lincoln Park also closed down.

Restaurants 

Calabrese owns and manages three restaurants in Chicago:

Karyn's On Green 

According to the 2014 Zagat Survey, Karyn's On Green was the top-rated vegan restaurant in Chicago and the most formal of Karyn's restaurants. Karyn's On Green is located in Chicago's West Loop. The restaurant closed in 2015.

Karyn's Raw Bistro 

Karyn's Raw Bistro is the longest-standing gourmet raw food restaurant in the United States.

Also connected to the restaurant is Karyn's Fresh Corner, a raw and organic market, and Karyn's Inner Beauty Center and O2 Day Spa, a holistic treatment center. Karyn's Raw Bistro is located in Chicago's Lincoln Park.

Published works 

Cleansing With Karyn: Secrets for Inner Healing and Outer Beauty 2011 
Karyn's Conscious Comfort Foods: Recipes for Everyday Life 2013

Awards and recognition 
Calabrese was the 2013 winner of the Harper's Bazaar Fabulous at Every Age competition for the 60+ age category.

References

External links

1947 births
Living people
20th-century African-American people
20th-century African-American women
21st-century African-American people
21st-century African-American women
African-American businesspeople
Alternative detoxification promoters
American women chefs
American cosmetics businesspeople
American women restaurateurs
American restaurateurs
American women in business
American veganism activists
Life extensionists
Raw foodists
Vegan cookbook writers
Women cookbook writers